KUSG may refer to:

 KUSG (AM), a radio station (1350 AM) licensed to serve Agana, Guam
 KMYU, a television station (channel 9, virtual 12) licensed to serve St. George, Utah, United States